Hunts Bay is located on the south coast of the Gower Peninsula, Wales, between Pwll du and Foxhole to the east of Three Cliffs Bay. It was once a sandy beach, but the sand depth on the beach is diminishing, leaving a rocky cove. The loss of sand has been attributed to sand dredging in the local coastal area.

References
Gower SOS
Surfs Up Mag: Hunts Bay
Surf-forecast.com: Hunts Bay

Bays of the Gower Peninsula